Goshen Springs (also New Goshen Springs) is an unincorporated community in Rankin County, Mississippi, United States.

History
The settlement was founded around 1833.

Goshen Springs had a post office. The historic building has since been moved to a museum in Brandon.

Near Goshen Springs is the Armstrong Site, a prehistoric archeological settlement listed on the National Register of Historic Places.

Goshen Springs lies along a now-abandoned portion of the Illinois Central Railroad.  The Rebel passenger train once passed through Goshen Springs each day.

In 1965, during the Civil Rights Movement, 31-year-old John Lee of Goshen Springs was found beaten to death on a county road. He had attended some civil rights meetings. His murder remains unsolved.

Notable people
 Eugene Hoy Barksdale was a World War I pilot, and then test pilot for the US Air Force in the 1920s. He was killed on duty while bailing out of a test plane.  Barksdale Air Force Base in Louisiana is named in his honor.

References

Unincorporated communities in Rankin County, Mississippi
Unincorporated communities in Mississippi